Beechwood Cemetery  is a city-owned cemetery in Durham, North Carolina, established in 1924.

External links
 General Services – Cemeteries Division from the City of Durham, NC website
 

Cemeteries in North Carolina
Geography of Durham, North Carolina
1924 establishments in North Carolina
Protected areas of Durham County, North Carolina